Zu-ye Olya (also Romanized as Zū-ye ‘Olyā, Zow-ye ‘Olyā, and Zūye ‘Olya; also known as Zū-ye Bālā and Zow) is a village in Howmeh Rural District, in the Central District of Maneh and Samalqan County, North Khorasan Province, Iran. At the 2006 census, its population was 673, in 146 families.

References 

Populated places in Maneh and Samalqan County